Nagpuria or Nagpuriya may refer to:
 Nagpuria people, an ethnic group mainly found in Jharkhand, India
 Nagpuria language, or Sadri, a language mainly spoken in Jharkhand, India
 Nagpuria dialect (Garhwal), a language variety of Uttarakhand, India

See also 
 Nagpuri (disambiguation)

Language and nationality disambiguation pages